Trawniki  is a village in Świdnik County, Lublin Voivodeship, in eastern Poland. It is the seat of the present-day gmina (administrative district) called Gmina Trawniki.

The village has a population of 2,893.

History
During World War II and the Nazi occupation of Poland, Trawniki was the location of the Trawniki concentration camp. This camp provided slave labourers for nearby industrial plants of the SS Ostindustrie. They worked in appalling conditions with little food, and many died of disease, malnutrition and ill treatment. 

From September 1941 until July 1944, the camp was also used for training guards recruited from Soviet POWs, who were known as "Hiwi" (German letterword for 'Hilfswillige', lit. "those willing to help"), for service with Auxiliary police in occupied Poland. 

In addition to serving as guards at concentration and death camps, the Trawniki men (German: Trawnikimänner) took part in Operation Reinhard, the Nazi extermination of Polish Jews. They conducted executions at extermination camps and in Jewish ghettos, including at Belzec, Sobibor, Treblinka II, Warsaw (three times, see Stroop Report), Częstochowa, Lublin, Lvov, Radom, Kraków, Białystok (twice), Majdanek as well as Auschwitz, and Trawniki itself.

See also
 Jewish ghettos in German-occupied Poland

References

Villages in Świdnik County
Holocaust locations in Poland